The Svenska Folkbibeln (Swedish People's Bible) is a contemporary translation of the Bible in Swedish. The New Testament was published in 1996 and the entire Bible in 1998. During the autumn of 2014 a revised edition of the Book of Psalms and the New Testament was published. In 2015 a minor revision of the Old Testament was released together with the 2014 revision of the New Testament, resulting in Svenska Folkbibeln 2015. In this version, the footnotes were also improved and extended. Plans exist for a more thorough revision of the Old Testament, but the 2015 edition will be the one in use for the foreseeable future.

The reason for the translation was that many conservative Christians considered the contemporary official translation, Bibel 2000, to be heavily influenced by liberal theology and higher criticism.

References

External links

 Svenska Folkbibeln (Full text)

Bible translations into Swedish
Swedish books
1998 non-fiction books
2014 non-fiction books
1998 in Christianity